The J.B. Smith House and Granary is located in Green Bay, Wisconsin. It was added to the State and the National Register of Historic Places in 2004.

The property includes a house and a granary both built around 1885, and a non-contributing c.1970 pole shed.  The house and granary show Belgian influence in their architecture.  The granary is the more historically important.

References

Houses on the National Register of Historic Places in Wisconsin
Agricultural buildings and structures on the National Register of Historic Places in Wisconsin
National Register of Historic Places in Brown County, Wisconsin
Buildings and structures in Green Bay, Wisconsin
Granaries
Brick buildings and structures
Houses completed in 1885